Last Christmas (Original Motion Picture Soundtrack) is the soundtrack album consisting of songs performed solely by George Michael and with Andrew Ridgeley through the eponymous pop duo Wham!. Serving as the soundtrack to the 2019 film Last Christmas directed by Paul Feig, it was released on 8 November 2019 by Legacy Recordings, on the date of the film's release, and consisted 14 existing songs, as well as a previously unreleased song originally completed in 2015 titled "This Is How (We Want You to Get High)". It additionally featured a bonus track, released in the Japanese edition. The album featured at multiple chart positions since 2019 and received positive reviews.

Background voices 

Last Christmas is based on Michael and Ridgeley's eponymous song released in 1984, and also inspired from their music. Feig told in an interview to BBC News, that Michael was about to compile his new album before his death in 2016. Hence, he discovered the unreleased song "This Is How (We Want You to Get High)" that was recorded in 2015, and included it as a part of the soundtrack, which Feig had ultimately said "It's a very celebratory song, I would dare say. And we were able to play the entire song, which is almost six minutes long, in the film. Because when you get a song that has never been heard, you don't want to just use, like, 15 seconds of it. The song starts at the end of the film, and then goes into the credits." Livingstone, the film's producer who had consulted Michael in the past and considered his involvement before his death, referred to the song as "the last sanctioned project he signed off on" and its intended inclusion in an album, also meant that "it wasn’t like we dredged up an old song".

Feig felt that Michael's music affects the story, further adding: "There are a couple of sections where the actors are actually interacting with the music and other sections where George's music is driving, or underscoring the story. So it's a nice mix of being neither a jukebox movie nor straight up musical."

Release 
The album released on digital, CD and two-disc vinyl formats on 8 November 2019, by Legacy Recordings. The album consisted remastered and edited versions of the songs produced by George Michael and Wham! and an additional track in the Japanese edition.

Reception 
Pip-Eliwood Hughes of Entertainment Focus wrote "Whether or not audiences are loving Last Christmas in cinemas, this soundtrack should get plenty of attention. It’s a whistlestop tour of George Michael’s remarkable career and there’s no doubt he had a lasting impact on music. Had his life not been cut short, he would have made plenty more music to add to his legacy. At least we’ll always have these songs and Last Christmas is a concise history of the iconic star’s long-lasting legacy."

Track listing

Charts

Weekly charts

Year-end charts

Score album

References 

2019 soundtrack albums
2010s film soundtrack albums